Monticello is a typeface, a transitional, based upon the Roman Pica no. 1 foundry type made by the American type foundry Binny & Ronaldson in the 1790s. It is considered the first typeface designed and manufactured in the United States. American Type Founders Co. issued a version, based on the original molds, named Oxford. In 1949, Linotype Corporation issued a Monticello typeface for hot metal machine composition for the published edition of The Papers of Thomas Jefferson. A digital version, also named Monticello, was issued in 2003 by Matthew Carter for the Jefferson Papers. Jefferson knew and corresponded with James Ronaldson.

References

External links
 Monticello Typeface

Transitional serif typefaces